Ollikainen is a Finnish surname. Notable people with the surname include:

 Aki Ollikainen (born 1973), Finnish writer
 Eva Ollikainen (born 1982), Finnish conductor
 Mikko Ollikainen (born 1977), Finnish politician
 Otto Ollikainen (born 2001), Finnish footballer
 Suvi Ollikainen (born 1995), Finnish ice hockey player

Finnish-language surnames